Nationality words link to articles with information on the nation's poetry or literature (for instance, Irish or France).

Events
 Gavin Douglas, Scottish poet, writes , approximately this year (published about 1535); an allegory presented as a vision
 Marko Marulić, Croatian poet, writes Judita ("Judith"), a landmark poem in Croatian literature; the book was not printed until 1521 in Venice by Guglielmo da Fontaneto; and published three times before the author's death in 1524

Works published
 Conradus Celtis, Ludus Diannae, allegorical verse drama, German poet who wrote in Latin
 Petrarch ("Francesco Petrarca"), Le cose volgari influential edition of the author's Italian poems, edited by Pietro Bembo, Venice: Aldine Press, Italy, posthumous

Births
Death years link to the corresponding "[year] in poetry" article:
 Maurice Scève, born about this year (died c. 1564), French poet
 Garcilaso de la Vega (died 1536), Spanish soldier and poet
 Basilio Zanchi, born about this year (died 1558/59), Italian, Latin-language poet

Deaths
Birth years link to the corresponding "[year] in poetry" article:
 January 3 – Ali-Shir Nava'i, also known as "Mir Alisher Navoï", (born c. 1441), philosopher and Persian-Uzbek poetry poet during the Timurid Renaissance
 September 26 – Džore Držić (born 1461), Croatian poet and playwright
 Also:
 Gabriele Altilio (born 1436), Italian, Latin-language poet
 Amerigo Corsini (born 1442), Italian, Latin-language poet
 Olivier de la Marche died this year or 1502 (born 1426), French poet and author
 Michael Marullus also known as "Michele Marullo" (born 1453, or about that year), Italian, Latin-language poet
 Jean Michel (born unknown), French dramatic poet

See also

 Poetry
 16th century in poetry
 16th century in literature
 French Renaissance literature
 Grands Rhétoriqueurs
 Renaissance literature
 Spanish Renaissance literature

Notes

16th-century poetry
Poetry